Night Owls is an EP by Filipino heavy metal band Slapshock, released on April 26, 2014 by apl.de.ap's label BMBX Entertainment. The album's carrier single "Night Owls" was released on April 7, 2014. the band 2nd single "The Crown" featuring Apl. De Ap was released on 2015.

Track listing

Personnel 
Vladimir Garcia – vocals
Lee Nadela - bass
Leandro Ansing - guitar
Jerry Basco - guitar
Richard Evora – drums

Additional Musician:
Shavo Odadjian - additional guitar (track 5)
Roem Baur - additional vocals (track 6)

Album Credits 
All Songs Co-Produced by: Slapshock
Executive Producers: Apl. de ap, David Kostiner, Audie Vergara, Lean Ansing
Recorded in: Los Angeles and San Francisco, CA
Mastered in Los Angeles by: John Greenham
Production: Damian Page Lewis & Edgar Sinio, Shavo Odadjian (track 5)
Additional Production (track 5): Damian Page Lewis & Edgar Sinio
Vocal Production: Todd Herfindel
Engineered by: Damian Page Lewis & Edgar Sinio

References

2014 EPs
Slapshock albums